The 1982 European Tour was the 11th official season of golf tournaments known as the PGA European Tour and organised by the Professional Golfers' Association. It was the first year that the schedule included a tournament outside Europe, visiting North Africa for the Tunisian Open.

The season was made up of 27 tournaments counting for the Official Money List, and some non-counting "Approved Special Events".

The Official Money List was won by Australia's Greg Norman.

Changes for 1982
There were several changes from the previous season, with the addition of the Tunisian Open, the Car Care Plan International and the Sanyo Open, the return of the Portuguese Open; and the Trophée Lancôme became a counting event for the first time.

Shortly after the start of the season, the Greater Manchester Open was cancelled.

Schedule
The following table lists official events during the 1982 season.

Unofficial events
The following events were sanctioned by the European Tour, but did not carry official money, nor were wins official.

Official money list
The official money list was based on prize money won during the season, calculated in Pound sterling.

Awards

See also
List of golfers with most European Tour wins

Notes

References

External links
1982 season results on the PGA European Tour website
1982 Order of Merit on the PGA European Tour website

European Tour seasons
European Tour